Japan Academy Prize may refer to:

Japan Academy Prize (academics), an award of the Japan Academy in recognition of outstanding academic achievements
Japan Academy Film Prize, an award of the Nippon Academy-Sho Association for achievements in film
Imperial Prize of the Japan Academy, an award of the Japan Academy to non-members in recognition of outstanding academic achievements